Winter Story is a 1980 children's book, the final of the four seasons of Jill Barklem's Brambly Hedge series. In the book the biggest snowstorm in years leaves enough snow for an ice ball. The Economist review of books described the book as a "(Beatrix) potter through Brambly Hedge", "mousy little tales with beautiful, busy drawings".

References

1980 children's books
British picture books
British children's books